The College of Engineering at the Georgia Institute of Technology provides formal education and research in more than 10 fields of engineering, including aerospace, chemical, civil engineering, electrical engineering, industrial, mechanical, materials engineering, biomedical, and biomolecular engineering, plus polymer, textile, and fiber engineering. The College of Engineering is the oldest and largest college of the institution.

History

The history of the College of Engineering spans more than 125 years, since the founding of Georgia Tech. Beginning with classes for mechanical engineering in 1888, the College of Engineering has evolved into separate Schools for more than 10 fields of engineering.

Programs, departments and schools

 Daniel Guggenheim School of Aerospace Engineering
 Wallace H. Coulter Department of Biomedical Engineering
 School of Chemical and Biomolecular Engineering
 School of Civil and Environmental Engineering
 School of Electrical and Computer Engineering
 H. Milton Stewart School of Industrial and Systems Engineering
 School of Materials Science and Engineering
 George W. Woodruff School of Mechanical Engineering

Facilities
The offices of the College of Engineering are located on the third floor of Tech Tower.

References

External links
 

College of Engineering
Engineering schools and colleges in the United States
Engineering universities and colleges in Georgia (U.S. state)
Educational institutions established in 1885
1885 establishments in Georgia (U.S. state)
University subdivisions in Georgia (U.S. state)